Monroe Township is one of the twenty-two townships of Coshocton County, Ohio, United States. As of the 2010 census the population was 525.

Geography
Located in the northwestern part of the county, it borders the following townships:
Killbuck Township, Holmes County - northeast
Clark Township - east
Bethlehem Township - southeast corner
Jefferson Township - south
Newcastle Township - southwest corner
Tiverton Township - west
Richland Township, Holmes County - northwest

No municipalities are located in Monroe Township, but it does contain the unincorporated communities of New Princeton and Spring Mountain.

Name and history
It is one of twenty-two Monroe Townships statewide.

Monroe Township was settled chiefly by emigrants from Pennsylvania and Virginia. Monroe Township was organized in 1824.

Government
The township is governed by a three-member board of trustees, who are elected in November of odd-numbered years to a four-year term beginning on the following January 1. Two are elected in the year after the presidential election and one is elected in the year before it. There is also an elected township fiscal officer, who serves a four-year term beginning on April 1 of the year after the election, which is held in November of the year before the presidential election. Vacancies in the fiscal officership or on the board of trustees are filled by the remaining trustees.

References

External links
County website

Townships in Coshocton County, Ohio
Townships in Ohio